72 Ghanta (72 Hours) Indian Bengali drama film directed and produced by Atanu Ghosh. The film is released in Chorki, a Bangladeshi OTT platform. This is the last film of veteran Bengali actor Soumitra Chatterjee which will be released posthumously.

Plot
An old man, former stand-up comedian commits suicide and thereafter six different stories unfold one by one. The 12 protagonists of the stories are appearing unrelated but latter reveals that they are highly interlinked.

Cast
 Soumitra Chatterjee
 Paran Bandopadhyay as Sharat
 Abir Chatterjee as Anamro
 Ritwick Chakraborty
 Kharaj Mukherjee as Pulin
 Sudipta Chakraborty as Pritha
 Ananya Chatterjee
 Indrani Haldar as Anjana
 Riya Banik as Kousani
 Ranodeep Bose

References

External links
 72 Ghanta on Chorki
 

Chorki original films
2021 films
2021 drama films
Indian thriller drama films
Bengali-language Indian films
2020s Bengali-language films
Films directed by Atanu Ghosh